Azpetrol Ltd. LLC is an Azerbaijani oil and gas company, with 88 filling stations in the country.

Overview 
The principal activity of Azpetrol, which opened its first filling station in July 1997 in Baku, is the retail and wholesale of fuel through its petrol and gas stations network.

It operates 83 petrol stations (PS) and 5 gas stations (GS), furnished with the latest equipment, and covering most regions of Azerbaijan. Azpetrol opened a modern fuel depot in 1999. Azpetrol has 120 tanker trucks. Azpetrol is one of the largest employers in the country, with more than 3200 staff. The general director is Mammadov Jeyhun, and the first deputy is Ali Karimli.

Awards  
 In April 2013 Azpetrol was presented the prize in the nomination "The leader of its field" by "UGUR" National Award. 
 In April 2013 Azpetrol was awarded "International Quality Crown" in the category of excellence in its services by B.I.D International Quality Convention. The former general director Huseynaga Rahimov was presented the award of "Entrepreneur of the Year". 
 In March 2013 Azpetrol won the award in the category "Fuel Brand of the Year" in the awarding ceremony «Brand of Azerbaijan».

References

External links 
 https://www.azernews.az/oil_and_gas/122062.html

Oil and gas companies of Azerbaijan
Azerbaijani brands
Automotive fuel retailers
Companies based in Baku
Energy companies established in 1997
Non-renewable resource companies established in 1997